The 1987 NCAA Division III women's basketball tournament was the sixth annual tournament hosted by the NCAA to determine the national champion of Division III women's collegiate basketball in the United States.

Wisconsin–Stevens Point defeated Concordia Moorhead in the championship game, 81–74, to claim the Pointers' first Division III national title.

The championship rounds were hosted in Scranton, Pennsylvania.

Bracket
First Round (round of 32)
 St. John Fisher 69, NYU 59
 Stony Brook 77, Rochester (NY) 72
 Scranton 62, Marywood 57
 Elizabethtown 71, Spring Garden 56
 Wis.-Stevens Point 75, St. Norbert 58
 Alma 67, Wis.-Whitewater 48
 Rockford 69, St. Thomas (MN) 65
 William Penn 55, Augustana (IL) 53
 Southern Me. 79, Clark (MA) 70
 Emmanuel (MA) 62, Salem St. 58
 Kean 87, Allegheny 68
 Ohio Northern 68, Capital 64
 Rust 79, Buffalo St. 60
 Centre 79, UNC Greensboro 69
 Concordia-M’head 77, Stanislaus St. 64
 Pomona-Pitzer 74, Bishop 50

Regional Finals (sweet sixteen)
 St. John Fisher 63, Stony Brook 54
 Scranton 66, Elizabethtown 59
 Wis.-Stevens Point 67, Alma 55
 William Penn 67, Rockford 64
 Southern Me. 70, Emmanuel (MA) 53
 Kean 69, Ohio Northern 58
 Rust 76, Centre 50
 Concordia-M’head 68, Pomona-Pitzer 46

Elite Eight

All-tournament team
 Jessica Beachy, Concordia Moorhead
 Una Espenkotter, Scranton
 Wendy Norris, Kean
 Donna Pivonka, Wisconsin–Stevens Point
 Karla Miller, Wisconsin–Stevens Point

See also
 1987 NCAA Division I women's basketball tournament
 1987 NCAA Division II women's basketball tournament
 1987 NCAA Division III men's basketball tournament
 1987 NAIA women's basketball tournament

References

 
NCAA Division III women's basketball tournament
1987 in sports in Pennsylvania